Huang Mengying (born 6 December 1990), also known as Maggie Huang, is a Chinese actress who graduated from the Beijing Film Academy. She rose to fame for her role as Sujin in Eternal Love (2017), and gained increased recognition for her supporting roles in Princess Agents and Lost Love in Times.

Filmography

Television series

Awards and nominations

References

Living people
1990 births
Chinese television actresses
21st-century Chinese actresses
Actresses from Chengdu
Beijing Film Academy alumni
Jay Walk Studio